FK Crvena Zvezda Josifovo is a football club based in village of Josifovo near Valandovo, North Macedonia. They have played in the Macedonian Third League.

History
The club was founded in 1959.

References

External links
Club info at MacedonianFootball 
Football Federation of Macedonia 

Crvena Zvezda Josifovo
Association football clubs established in 1959
1959 establishments in the Socialist Republic of Macedonia
Valandovo Municipality